Phyllonorycter triarcha is a moth of the family Gracillariidae. It is known from India (Bihar), Indonesia (Moluccas), Malaysia (West Malaysia), the Philippines (Luzon, Negros) and Thailand. This species is a well-known pest of cotton.

The larvae feed on Gossypium species, including Gossypium barbadense and Gossypium herbaceum. They mine the leaves of their host plant. The mine is found on the lower surface of the leaf. It is yellowish-white with brown spots.

References

triarcha
Moths of Asia
Moths described in 1908